Karin Nellemose (3 August 1905 – 5 August 1993) was a Danish actress in the theatre and in Danish cinema. She was the sister of sculptor Knud Nellemose (1908–1997). In Matador (Danish produced and first shown between 1978 and 1982), she plays a significant role as the confused spinster Misse Møhge.

Selected filmography 

 Du skal ære din hustru 1925
  1927
  1927
 The Vicar of Vejlby 1931
  1932
  1934
 Nøddebo Præstegård 1934
  1938
 Livet på Hegnsgaard 1938
  1939
  1940
  1941
 Tyrannens fald 1942
  1942
  1942
  1944
  1944
  1945
 Brevet fra afdøde 1946
  1946
  1946
 Soldaten og Jenny 1947
  1948
  1948
 Hr. Petit 1948
 Kampen mod uretten 1949
 Susanne 1950
 Café Paradis 1950
 Min kone er uskyldig 1950
  1952
 We Who Go the Kitchen Route 1953
 The Old Mill on Mols 1953
 Sønnen 1953
 Hejrenæs 1953
 Adam og Eva 1953
  1954
 Hendes store aften 1954
  1955
 Jeg elsker dig 1957
 Baronessen fra benzintanken 1960
 Støv på hjernen 1961
 Det stod i avisen 1962
 Dronningens vagtmester 1963
 Pigen og greven 1966

References 

1905 births
1993 deaths
20th-century Danish actresses
Actresses from Copenhagen
Best Actress Bodil Award winners
Danish film actresses
Danish silent film actresses
Best Supporting Actress Bodil Award winners